Rafid may refer to:

Places
Al-Rafid, Lebanon
Al-Rafid, Syria

Persons
Rafid Topan Sucipto, Indonesian motorcycle racer
Rafid Lestaluhu,  Indonesian professional footballer
Rafid Badr Al-Deen,  Iraqi football  player